The Barelvi movement, also known as Ahl al-Sunnah wa'l-Jamaah (People of the Prophet's Way and the Community) is a Sunni revivalist movement following the Hanafi and Shafi'i schools of jurisprudence, with strong Sufi influences and with over hundreds of millions of followers in South Asia and also in parts of Europe, America and Africa. It is a broad Sufi-oriented movement that encompasses a variety of Sufi orders, including the Chistis, Qadiris, Soharwardis and Naqshbandis. They consider themselves to be the continuation of Sunni Islam before the rise of Salafism and Deobandi Movement. 

The movement drew inspiration from the Sunni Sufi doctrines of Shah Abdur Rahim (1644-1719) founder of Madrasah-i Rahimiyah and father of Shah Waliullah Dehlawi, Shah Abdul Aziz Muhaddith Dehlavi (1746 –1824) and Fazl-e-Haq Khairabadi (1796–1861) founder of the Khairabad School. It emphasizes personal devotion to God and the Islamic prophet Muhammad, adherence to Sharia, and Sufi practices such as veneration of saints. They are also called Sunni Sufis. Ahmed Raza Khan Barelvi (1856–1921) who was a Sunni Sufi scholar and reformer in north India wrote extensively in defense of Muhammad and popular Sufi practices and became the leader of a movement called "Ahl-i Sunnat wa Jamàat".

Etymology
According to Oxford Reference, Ahl al-Sunnah wa'l-Jamaah or Barelvi is movement developed on the basis of writings of Mawlana Ahmed Raza Khan Barelwi.
The Database of Religious History refers the movement as the Ahl-e-Sunnat wa Jamaat (often, Ahl-e-Sunnat) which has a strong presence in South Asia.

Professor Usha Sanyal, an expert on 'Ahl-i Sunnat Movement', referred the movement as Ahl-i Sunnat. She wrote that the movement refer to themselves as 'Sunnis' in their literature and prefer to be known by the title of Ahle Sunnat wa Jama'at a reference to their perception as forming an international majority movement, although Barelvi is the term used by section of media.

Main leaders of Ahle Sunnat movement Imam Ahmad Raza Khan and other scholars never used the term 'Barelvi' to identify themselves or their movement; they saw themselves as Sunni Muslims defending traditional Sunni beliefs from deviations. Only later was the term 'Barelvi'  used by the section of media and by opposition groups  on the basis of  the hometown Bareilly, of its main leader Imam Ahmed Raza Khan Qadri (1856–1921).

History
Islamic scholar and teacher of Ahmed Raza Khan Qadri, Maulana Naqi Ali Khan (1830-1880) had refuted the ideas of Sayyid Ahmad Barelwi (d. 1831), who was a founder of Wahabism in India.
Naqi Ali Khan declared Sayyid Ahmad Rae Barelwi, a 'Wahabi' due to his support for Muhammad ibn Abd al-Wahhab's ideology. In his writings, Naqi 'Ali defended Muhammad against what he considered the belittling of his powers by Sayyid Ahmad Rae Barelwi and his associate Shah Isma'il Dihlawi.
Similarly, founder of Khairabad school, Allama Fazl-e-Haq Khairabadi in 1825 in his book 'Tahqîqul-Fatâwâ' and  
Allama Fazle-Rasûl Badayûnî in his book 'Saiful-Jabbâr' issued Fatwas against the founders of Ahle Hadith and Deobandi sect  This refutation of traditional scholars against newly emerging Wahabi sect influenced Sunni scholars such as Ahmed Raza Khan Qadri and paved the way for more organised movement which later came to be known as Ahle-Sunnat movement in South Asia. The movement formed as a defense of the traditional mystic practices of South Asia, which it sought to prove and support.

The Ahl-i Sunnat or Sunni Barelwi movement began in the 1880s under the leadership of Ahmad Raza Khan (1856-1921), who spent his lifetime writing fatwas (judicial opinion) and later established Islamic schools in 1904 with the Manzar-e-Islam in the Bareilly and other madrasas in Pilibhit and Lahore cities. The Barelvi movement formed as a defense of the traditional mystic practices of South Asia, which it sought to prove and support.

The movement views themselves as Sunni or Ahle Sunnat wal Jamaat  and according to it main leaders of the movement including Imam Ahmad Riza Khan, did not invent new sect but defended traditional Sunni Islam. According to Ahle Sunnat scholars, Deobandis have created a new sect.
The Sunni madrasas of this movement have rarely, if ever, been involved in extremist politics and militancy.

Propagation against Shuddhi (Arya Samaj conversion) Movement
Hindu Arya Samaj, through its founder Swami Dayanand Saraswati initiated converting Muslims back in to Hinduism specially in North India, and Punjab in early 1900s.
They became active in Bharatpur State and among the neo-Muslim Malkanas, in Etawah, Kanpur, Shahajahnpur, Hardoi, Meerut and Mainpuri in the western United Provinces, exhorting them to return to what they called their 'ancestral religion'. As a result, the movement became controversial and antagonized the Muslims populace 
To counter this movement Indian Muslims started Islamic Dawa work among the Muslim population and challenged the Arya Samaj leaders for debates. Mufti Naeemuddin Moradabadi, Mustafa Raza Khan Qadri and Hamid Raza Khan along with a team of Ahle Sunnat scholars through Jama'at Raza-e-Mustafa worked in north Indian towns and villages against the Shuddhi movement.
    
The Jama'at Raza-e-Mustafa prevented around four hundred thousand conversions to Hinduism in eastern U.P and Rajasthan during its activities under anti-Shuddhi movement.
In 1917, Islamic scholar Mufti Naeem-ud-Deen Muradabadi organized the historical Jama'at Raza-e-Mustafa conference at Jamia Naeemia Moradabad U.P, with a mission to curb, and if possible reverse, the tide of re-conversions threatening the Muslim community in the wake of the Shuddhi movement.

Shaheed Ganj Mosque Movement
Shaheed Ganj Mosque was commissioned in 1722 during the reign of Mughal Emperor Alamgir II and built by Abdullah Khan. The construction was completed in 1753. It was located in Naulakha Bazaar area of Lahore, Punjab, Pakistan. In 1762, the Bhangi misl Sikh army conquered Lahore and occupied the mosque. The Muslims were not allowed to enter and pray, although Sikhs were given the right to pray. The Sikhs built a gurdwara in the courtyard while the Mosque building was used as a residence for the Sikh priest.
On 17 April 1850, a case was in Punjab High Court. Several suits were filed between 1853 and 1883 to recover the Shaheed Ganj Mosque, but courts maintained the status quo. On 29 June 1935, the Sikhs announced that they would demolish the Shaheed Ganj Mosque. Several thousand Muslims assembled in front of the mosque to protect it. But, on the night of 7 July 1935 the Sikhs demolished the mosque, leading to riots and disorder in Lahore. 
Ahle Sunnat scholar and Sufi Peer Jamaat Ali Shah of Sialkot, Pakistan, led the Shaheed Ganj Mosque movement.
Muslims held a public meeting on 19–20 July 1935 at the Badshahi mosque, and marched directly on the Shaheedganj mosque. Police opened fire on the crowd to kill more than a dozen.

Peer Jamaat Ali Shah presided over the first session of the Conference to organize protests against the demolition. He was appointed the Chief of the protests. "Shaheedganj Day" was observed on 20 September 1935 under his leadership. His appointment as leader of this movement garnered support from other Sunni scholars. Fazal Shah of Jalalpur and Ghulam Mohiuddin of Golra Sharif,  Zainulabedin Shah of the Gilani family from Multan and Anjuman Hizb-ul-Ahnaf from Lahore offered support to Shah's leadership. This consensus created a religious and political base which reduced urban-rural differences. The struggle continued for several years.

All India Sunni Conference
Ahle Sunnat established in 1925 a body of Islamic scholars and Sufis named All India Sunni Conference, in the wake of Congress led secular Indian nationalism, changing geo-political situation of India. Islamic scholars and popular leaders Jamaat Ali Shah, Naeem-ud-Deen Muradabadi, Mustafa Raza Khan Qadri, Amjad Ali Aazmi, Abdul Hamid Qadri Badayuni , Mohammad Abdul Ghafoor Hazarvi and Pir Syed Faiz-ul Hassan Shah were the main leaders.
In 1925, its first Conference was attended by three hundred Ulema and Mashaikh. AISC focus was on Unity, brotherhood, preaching and protection of Islamic faith with a stress on need for acquiring modern education for Muslims.
The Second Conference was held in Badaun U.P in October 1935 under the Presidency of Jamaat Ali Shah. It discussed Shaheed Ganj Mosque Movement. and openly opposed Ibn Saud's policies in Arabia, the Conference demanded to respect the Holy and sacred places of the Muslims. The third Conference held on 27–30 April 1946 at Benaras discussed the disturbed condition of the country and possible solution for the Muslims in the wake of demand for Pakistan.

All India Muslim League
Several Sufi Barelvi scholars supported the All-India Muslim League and Pakistan's demand claiming that Congress aimed at establishing Hindu state and arguing, that Muslims need to have their own country. Few Barelvi scholars opposed the partition of India and the League's demand to be seen as the only representative of Indian Muslims.

Main roles played by Ahle Sunnat movement scholars and leaders: 

In the aftermath of the 1948 Partition, they formed an association to represent the movement in Pakistan, called Jamiat Ulema-e-Pakistan (JUP). Like ulema of the Deobandi and Ahl-i Hadith movements, Barelvi ulema have advocated application of sharia law across the country.

As a reaction to the critique de Islam film Innocence of Muslims, a conglomerate of forty Barelvi parties called for a boycott of Western goods, while at the same time condemning violence which had taken place in protest against the film.

Beliefs
Like other Sunni Muslims, they base their beliefs on the Quran and Sunnah and believe in monotheism and the prophethood of Muhammad. Although Barelvis may follow any one of the Ashari and Maturidi schools of Islamic theology and one of the Hanafi, Maliki, Shafi'i and Hanbali madhhabs of fiqh in addition to optionally choosing from one of the Sunni Sufi orders or tariqas, most Barelvis in South Asia follow the Maturidi school of Islamic theology, the Hanafi madhhab of fiqh and the Qadiri or Chishti Sufi orders. Barelvis in Southern parts of India such as Kerala, Karnataka and Tamil Nadu follow Shafi'i maddhab of fiqh and Ashari school of Islamic Theology. Barelvis have mostly the same beliefs and structure of Sunni Sufis around the world as they celebrate Mawlid, belief in Taqleed, belief in Sufi Saints and follow Sufi Orders.

Positions
Several beliefs and practices differentiate the Barelvi movement from others (particularly Deobandis and Wahhabis including beliefs in the intercession of Muhammad, the knowledge of Muhammad, the "Nur Muhammadiyya" (Light of Muhammad), and whether Muhammad views and witnesses actions of people.

Intercession of Muhammad
All jurists comprising Imami, Shafi'i, Maliki, Hanafi and Hanbali are unanimous on the permissibly of tawassul whether during the lifetime of Muhammad or after his death.

Tawassul is a fundamental belief of all traditional Sunni movements. The belief is that Prophet Muhammad helps in this life and in the afterlife. According to this doctrine, God helps through Muhammad (Tawassul). Sunni Muslims of the Barelvi movement believe that any ability that Muhammad has to help others is from God, who helps through Muhammad. The help received from Muhammad is therefore considered God's help. 
Proponents of this belief look to the Quran  as a proof that God prefers to help through Muhammad.
One of the titles of the Prophet is 'shaafi', one who performs intercession. Other spiritual leaders who will act as intermediaries will be prophets, martyrs, huffaz of the Quran, angels and pious people whom God deems fit. Prophet Jesus' intercession for his people on the Day of Judgment is mentioned in the Quran (5:16-18).
They also believe that in the afterlife, on the day of judgement, Muhammad will intercede on the behalf of his followers and God will forgive his nation of sins and allow them to enter Jannah (paradise).
The belief of Muhammad providing support and help is a common theme within classical Sunni literature. 
The Quran says, 
O you who believe! Fear Allah and seek a wasila to him (5:35). Further, the Quran says, 
We sent not the Messenger, but to be obeyed, in accordance with the will of Allah. If they had only, when they were unjust to themselves, come to the Messenger and asked Allah's forgiveness, and the Messenger had (also) asked forgiveness for them, they would have found Allah indeed Oft-returning, Most Merciful.(Al-Qur'an, Surah an-Nisa, 4:64)

The belief of Muhammad interceding is found in various hadith as well.
A Bedouin of the desert visited the Prophet's tomb and greeted the Prophet, addressing him directly as if he were alive. "Peace upon you, Messenger of God!" Then he said, "I heard the word of God 'If, when they had wronged themselves . . .,' I came to you seeking pardon for my mistakes, longing for your intercession with our Lord!" The Bedouin then recited a poem in praise of the Prophet and departed. The person who witnessed the story says that he fell asleep, and in a dream he saw the Prophet saying to him, "O 'Utbi, rejoin our brother the Bedouin and announce [to] him the good news that God has pardoned him!"

Syrian Islamic scholars Salih al-Nu'man, Abu Sulayman Suhayl al-Zabibi, and Mustafa ibn Ahmad al-Hasan al-Shatti al-Hanbali al-Athari al-Dimashqi have similarly released Fatwas in support of the practice.

Al-Suyuti in his book History of the Caliphs also reports Caliph Umar's prayer for rain after the death of Muhammad and specifies that on that occasion 'Umar was wearing his mantle (al-burda), a detail confirming his tawassul through Muhammad at that occasion. Sahih al-Bukhari narrates similar situation as: 

Hadith states that on that day people will be running to and fro looking for an intercessor, until they come to the Prophet Muhammad, who will answer, "I am for intercession". The Lord will then ask him to "...intercede, for your intercession will be heard" (Bukhari). 

Sunni Muslims of this movement also commonly say Ya Rasool Allah ('O Messenger of Allah'), addressing Muhammad in the present tense with the belief that he is able to listen. They believe that Muhammad is a Rahmah (mercy) to all creation as mentioned in the Quran . Muhammad therefore is a means by which God expresses his attribute, Ar-Rahman, to creation.

Light of Muhammad (Nur Muhammadiyya)
A central doctrine of this movement is that Muhammad is both human and (Noor) light. Muhammad's physical birth was preceded by his existence as a light which predates creation. The primordial reality of Muhammad existed before creation, and God created for the sake of Muhammad. Adherents of this doctrine believe that the word Nur (light) in the Quran refers to Muhammad.

Sahl al-Tustari, the ninth-century Sunni Quran commentator, describes the creation of Muhammad's primordial light in his tafsir. Mansur Al-Hallaj (al-Tustari's student) affirms this doctrine in his book, Ta Sin Al-Siraj:

According to Stūdīyā Islāmīkā, all Sufi orders are united in the belief in the light of Muhammad.

Prophet views and witnesses (Hazir o Nazir) actions of people
Another central doctrine of this movement is that the Prophet Muhammad is a viewer and witness (حاضر و ناظر, Ḥāḍir-o nāẓir) actions of people. The doctrine appears in works predating the movement, such as Sayyid Uthman Bukhari's (d. ca. 1687) Jawahir al-Quliya (Jewels of the Friends of God), describing how Sufis may experience the presence of Muhammad. Proponents of this doctrine assert that the term Shahid (witness) in the Quran refers to this ability of Muhammad, and cite hadiths to support it.

This concept was interpreted by Shah Abdul Aziz in Tafsir Azizi in these words: The Prophet is observing everybody, knows their good and bad deeds, and knows the strength of faith (Imaan) of every individual Muslim and what has hindered his spiritual progress.

Hafiz Ibn Kathir says: "You are witness of the oneness of Allah Almighty and that there is no God except Allah. You will bear evidence about the actions and deed of whole mankind on the day of judgment.
(Tafseer Ibne Katheer, Vol. 3, Page 497).

Muhammad's Knowledge of the Unseen (Ilm-e-Ghaib)
A fundamental Sunni Barelvi belief is that Prophet Muhammad has knowledge of the unseen, which is granted him by Allah (ata'e) and is not equal to God's knowledge. This relates to the concept of Ummi as mentioned in the Quran. This movement does not interpret this word as "unlettered" or "illiterate", but "untaught". Muhammad learns not from humankind, but from Allah; his knowledge is universal, encompassing the seen and unseen realms. This belief predates this movement, and is found in Sunni books such as Rumi's Fihi Ma Fihi:

Allah has sent down to you the Book and Wisdom and has taught to you what you did not know, and great is the grace of Allah upon you" [Sura an-Nisa, verse 113].

Imam Jalal udin Al-Suyuti writes: (Taught to you what you did not know) means that Allah Most High has told the Prophet (may Allah bless him and grant him peace) of Ahkam and Unseen.

Qur'an states: This is of the tidings of the Unseen which We inspire in thee (Muhammad). Thou thyself knewest it not, nor did thy folk (know it) before this. Then have patience. Lo! the sequel is for those who ward off (evil).[Surah Hud (11), verse 49]

Qur'an states: Nor will He disclose to you the secrets of the Unseen. "But He chooses of His Apostles [for the purpose].[Sura Aali-Imran, verse 179]

Practices

Public celebration of Muhammad's birthday
Veneration of pious. This consists of the intervention of an ascending, linked and unbroken chain of holy persons claimed to reach ultimately to Muhammad who Barelvis believe intercede on their behalf with God.
Visiting the tombs of Prophet Muhammad, his companions and pious Muslims, an act they believe is supported by the Quran, Sunnah and the acts of the companions.
Group dhikr: synchronized movements of the body while chanting the names of God. Some groups, notably those in the Sufi Chishti Order, sing Qawwali; others do not use musical instruments.
Letting the beard grow. The four schools of fiqh generally (with the exception of the Shafi and Hanbali school of fiqh) consider it unlawful to trim a beard less than a fistful length.

Sufi tradition 
 
Sufism is a fundamental aspect of this movement. Imam Ahmad Raza Khan Barelvi was part of the Qadri tariqa and pledged bay'ah (allegiance) to Sayyid Shah Al ur-Rasul Marehrawi. Ahmad Raza Khan Barelvi instructed his followers in Sufi beliefs and practices. Traditional Sufi practices, such as devotion to Muhammad and the veneration of walis, remain an integral part of the movement (which defended the Sufi status quo in South Asia. They was at the forefront of defending Sufi doctrines such as the celebration of the birth of Prophet Muhammad and tawassul.

The wider Ahle Sunnat Wal jamaat Barelvi movement was sustained and connected through thousands of Sufi Urs festivals at Dargahs/shrines in south Asia, as well as in the Britain and other parts.

Ahmad Raza Khan Qadri and many Sunni scholars countered Deobandi, Ahl-i Hadith and Wahabi hardliners which resulted in the institutionalization of diverse Sufi movements in many countries of the world.

Presence

India

It defends a more traditional South Asian version of the faith centered on the practices of Sufi mysticism. 
India Today estimated that over two-thirds (2/3) of Muslims in India adhere to the Sufi oriented Ahle Sunnat (Barelvi) movement. 
Bareilly Sharif Dargah
Markaz-e-Ahle Sunnah at Dargah Ala Hazrat is one of the main center of Ahle Sunnat Wal Jamaat  movement in south Asia. Millions of people turned to seek guidance in Islamic matters towards this center of Islamic learning. Bareilly city has been heart throb of Sunni Muslims since 1870 when revered Islamic Scholar Ala Hazrat Imam Ahmed Raza Khan established Fatwa committee under the guidance of his father Naqi Ali Khan. Later, his son Maulana Hamid Raza Khan and Mufti Azam-e-Hind Mustafa Raza Khan continued Fatwa work.

In mid-' 70s during The Emergency (India), Indian Govt. on the advice of Sanjay Gandhi, son of Prime Minister Smt. Indira Gandhi did try to force vasectomy (Nasbandi). Huge but unconfirmed numbers of young men were forcibly sterilized. Government officials, even school teachers were given orders to induce a predetermined number of males to endure vasectomy or Nasbandi, as it was called. Indian Muslims were finding to difficult to oppose this harsh Govt. action as the time was of emergency and the powers were totally in the hands of Prime Minister.
Mufti-e-Azam Mustafa Raza Khan at that time acted without pressure and passed a verdict against Vasectomy that it is Un-Islamic. He published his judicial verdict and circulated it all over the India giving a sigh of relief to Muslims but a tension to Indian Govt. The government unsuccessfully tried to get the Fatwa withdrawn and with in two years the Indira Gandhi lost the Parliamentary elections.
For Islamic missionary activities, Sunni Dawat-e-Islami (SDI) is an important Islamic preaching movement in India. It is working in at least 20 countries around the world. Muhammad Shakir Ali Noori founded it in Mumbai city. It has a large network of (Dawah workers) preachers in India and in other countries. Sunni Dawat-e-Islami has established many modern and religious educational institutions around India and some in other parts of the world.

At present Maulana Shahabuddin Razvi Bareilvi, Ziaul Mustafa Razvi Qadri, Muhammad Madni Ashraf Ashrafi Al-Jilani, Syed Ameen Mian Qaudri of Barkatiya Silsila, Shaikh Aboobacker Ahmad of All India Sunni Jamiatul Ulma and Mufti Mukarram Ahmad of Fatehpuri Masjid Delhi are some of the influential Sunni leaders of India. while Jama'at Raza-e-Mustafa, Bareilly, Raza Academy, Mumbai, and All India Ulema and Mashaikh Board, All India Tanzeem Ulama-e-Islam, Delhi are representative bodies.
 
The Grand Mufti of India is the senior and influential religious authority of the Islamic Community of India. The incumbent is Shafi Sunni scholar Sheikh Abubakr Ahmad, general secretary of All India Sunni Jamiyyathul Ulama, who was conferred the title in February 2019 at the Ghareeb Nawaz Peace Conference held at Ramlila Maidan, New Delhi, organised by the All India Tanzeem Ulama-e-Islam.

Madarsa Network

Al Jamiatul Ashrafia, Azamgarh, Jamia Naeemia Moradabad, Jamia Amjadia Rizvia, Ghosi Al-Jame-atul-Islamia, Mau, Markazu Saquafathi Sunniyya, Kerala and Jamia Nizamia, Hyderabad are some of the notable institutions of the movement. 
Markazu Saquafathi Sunniyya or Jamia Markaz operates more than 50 institutions and many sub-centers across the world.

Al Jamiatul Ashrafia is considered as a main institution of learning in north India with thousands of students across the country.

Pakistan

Sufism has strong links to South Asia dating back to the eighth and ninth centuries and preaches religious tolerance, encourages spiritual over ritualistic practicing of Islam, and encourages diversity. The Ahle Sunnat Barelvi movement has originated from South Asian Sufism itself. The religious and political leaders of this movement were followers of Sufism and lead the masses in to revivalist Sunni movement.
  
Time and The Washington Post gave assessments that vast majority of Muslims in Pakistan follow Ahle Sunnat Barelvi movement. Political scientist Rohan Bedi estimated that 60% of Pakistani Muslims follow this movement. The movement form a majority in the most populous state Punjab, Sindh and Azad Kashmir regions of Pakistan.
Dawat e Islami International, Tanzeem ul Madaris Ahle Sunnat, Jamiat Ulema-e-Pakistan, Jamaat Ahle Sunnat, Sunni Ittehad Council and Majlis-e-Tahaffuz-e-Khatme Nabuwwat are some of the leading organisations of Pakistani Sunni Muslims. While Jamia Nizamia Ghousia, Jamia Naeemia Lahore and Dar-ul-Madinah Schools are some of the leading seminaries of this movement.

Finality of Prophet-hood movement

In 1950, scholars of Ahle Sunnat Barelvi movement initiated a sub-movement named, 'Majlis-e-Tahaffuz-e-Khatme Nabuwwat' the history of which can be traced back to the 1880s when Mirza Ghulam Ahmad of Qadian proclaimed himself to be a prophet in Islam. This proclamation of Mirza Ghulam Ahmad was against the tenets of Islam and created a schism in the Muslim community. Therefore, with the aim to protect the belief in the finality of prophethood of Prophet Muhammad based on their concept of Khatam an-Nabiyyin. The movement launched countrywide campaigns and protests to declare Ahmadis as non-Muslims. 
Mohammad Abdul Ghafoor Hazarvi   Zafar Ali Khan, Abdul Hamid Qadri Badayuni, Khwaja Qamar ul Din Sialvi, Syed Faiz-ul Hassan Shah, Ahmad Saeed Kazmi, Abdul Sattar Khan Niazi, Pir of Manki Sharif Amin ul-Hasanat, Muhammad Karam Shah al-Azhari, Sardar Ahmad Qadri and Muhammad Hussain Naeemi were the leaders of the movement.

Scholars of various schools of thought under the leadership of Shah Ahmad Noorani Siddiqui, who was president of Jamiat Ulema-e-Pakistan initiated a successful campaign against the Ahmadis and compelled the National Assembly to declare Ahmadis as non-Muslims. And such a clause was inserted in the 1973 Constitution of Pakistan by Second Amendment to the Constitution of Pakistan.
After meeting the first agenda, Khatme-Nabuwat started the next phase of their campaign – to bar Ahmadis from using the title of Muslim. The then president General Muhammad Zia-ul-Haq passed an ordinance in 1984 amending the Pakistan Penal Code (PPC) commonly known as Ordinance XX.
Sunni leaders Shaikh ul Quran Allama Ghulam Ali Okarvi, Muhammad Shafee Okarvi, Syed Shujaat Ali Qadri, Iftikharul Hasan Shah and Khalid Hasan Shah were the main leaders of this sub-movement.

Madarsa Network in Pakistan

Tanzeem-ul-Madaris Ahl-e-Sunnat ASJ education board is the central organisation to register Ahle Sunnat Barelvi Madarsas. The board follows Sunni Barelvi ideology and is opponent of the Wahabi doctrine.

As per Islam online, around 10,000 madrassas are managed by Tanzeem-ul-Madaris Pakistan. 
Tahzibul Akhbar in its report on the educational services of Religious institutions has estimated that Tanzeem has 3000 institutions in Khyber Pakhtunwa and 1000 in the area of Hazara.

Muhammad Ramzan, in his report on Madarsas has stated that Tanzeem has most has maximum 5584 Madarsas in Punjab state in comparison to others. 'In Lahore 336, Sheikhupura 336, Gujranwala 633, Rawalpindi 387, Faisalabad 675, Sargodha 461, Multan 944, Sahiwal 458, D.G.Khan 605, Bahawalpur 749 madarsa are affiliated with the Tanzeem'. According to Rizwan, 'the Madarsas of Tanzeem are rarely involved in militancy which is maximum in Deobandis. In population, Barelvis or traditional Sunnis outnumber all other sects combined. They are about 53.4% of total population of the province'.

Stand on blasphemy laws 
The movement has opposed any change in the Pakistani blasphemy laws. They have always uphold the blasphemy as highest crime and endorsed the strict punishment for blasphemers.  
Punjab governor Salman Taseer was assassinated on 4 January 2011 by Mumtaz Qadri, a member of the Barelvi group Dawat-e-Islami, due to Taseer's opposition to Pakistan's blasphemy laws. Over five hundred scholars supported Qadri and a boycott of Taseer's funeral.

Persecution

They have been targeted and killed by radical Deobandi groups in Pakistan such as the TTP, SSP, LeJ, etc. Suicide attacks, vandalism and destruction of sites considered holy to those in the Sunni Barelvi movement have been perpetrated by Deobandi extremist groups. This includes attacks, destruction and vandalism of Sufi Data Darbar in Lahore, Abdullah Shah Ghazi's tomb in Karachi, Khal Magasi in Balochistan, and Rahman Baba's tomb in Peshawar. The murder of various Barelvi leaders have also been committed by Deobandi terrorists.
The clerics claim that there is a bias against them by various Pakistani establishments such as the DHA, who tend to appoint Deobandi Imams for mosques in their housing complexes rather than Barelvi ones. Historical landmarks such as Badshahi Masjid also have Deobandi Imams, which is a fact that has been used as evidence by Barelvi clerics for bias against Barelvis in Pakistan. The Milade Mustafa Welfare Society has asserted that the Religious Affairs Department of DHA interferes with Human Resources to ensure that Deobandi Imams are selected for mosques in their housing complex.

During the 1990s and 2000s, sporadic violence resulted from disputes between Barelvis and Deobandis over control of Pakistani mosques. The conflict came to a head in May 2001, when sectarian riots broke out after the assassination of Sunni Tehreek leader Saleem Qadri. In April 2006 in Karachi, a bomb attack on a Barelvi gathering celebrating Muhammad's birthday killed 57 people, including several Sunni Tehreek leaders. 
Militants believed to be affiliated with the Taliban and Sipah-e-Sahaba attacked Barelvis celebrating Mawlid in Faisalabad and Dera Ismail Khan on 27 February 2010, sparking tensions between the groups.

In 2021, the Pakistani government officially banned the Tehreek-e-Labbaik Pakistan and is severely cracking down on Sunni Muslim political voices of the Barelvi movement. Deobandi political parties like Jamiat Ulema-e-Islam (F), however, are still freely operating and even supported by elements within the Pakistani government.

Bangladesh
A sizeable number of Bangladeshi Muslims follow Ahle Sunnat (Barelvi) movement. Barelvi movement has strong bases in Chittagong and Sylhet region of Bangladesh.
Ahle Sunnat wal jamaat situated in Dhaka is a central organization of Barelvi ulemas of Bangladesh. A majority of Bangladeshi Muslims perceive Sufis as a source of spiritual wisdom and guidance and their Khanqahs and Dargahs as nerve centers of Muslim society
and large number of Bangladeshi Muslims identify themselves with a Sufi order, almost half of whom adhere to the Chishti order that became popular during the Mughal times, although the earliest Sufis in Bengal, such as Shah Jalal, belonged to the Suhrawardiyya order, whose global center is still Maner Sharif in Bihar. During the Sultanate period, Sufis emerged and formed khanqahs and dargahs that served as the nerve center of local communities.

World Sunni Movement led by Syed Mohammad Saifur Rahman is one of the main organisation of the movement which opposes Wahabi ideologies. Beside Bangladesh, WSM is active in various European and Gulf countries.
Bangladesh Islami Front and its students wing Bangladesh Islami Chattra Sena have worked to protect the faith and belief of Sunni Sufis in the country and took stands against Deobandi Hefazat-e-Islam Bangladesh and Khelafat Majlish. Jamia Ahmadiyya Sunnia Kamil Madrasa is a notable institution following ideology of Ahle Sunnat wal Jamaat or Maslak-e-Aala Hazrat.

United Kingdom

According to Irfan Al Alawi, 'The Sufism influenced Ahle Sunnat Barelvi in United Kingdom immigrated to Britain earlier than the Deobandis, established the main mosques in Britain. They integrated into UK society and are considered law abiding.'
moderate majority, peaceful and pious.

In 2011, the Ahle Sunnat Barelvi movement had most of the British mosques.
The majority of people in the United Kingdom of Pakistani and Kashmir origin are descended from immigrants from Sunni Barelvi-majority areas. 
 
In Manchester, by 2014, Ahle Sunnat Barelvi was the largest denomination in terms of the number of mosques and population.
The majority of Birmingham Muslims are adherent to the Ahle Sunnat barelvi movement.
The movement in Pakistan has received funding from their counterparts in the UK, in part as a reaction to rival movements in Pakistan also receiving funding from abroad. According to an editorial in the English-language Pakistani newspaper The Daily Times, many of these mosques have been however usurped by Saudi-funded radical organizations.

The Ahle Sunnat Barelvi movement formed British Muslim Forum (BMF) and the Sufi Muslim Council (SMC) in 2005 and 2006, respectively to represent themselves at the national level. In 2017, the movement had around 538 mosques in the United Kingdom along with their fellow Sufi organisations which are second largest in terms of number.
Pir Maroof Shah Qadri has built a number of mosques in Bradford.

Allama Arshadul Qaudri along with Peer Maroof Qadri established World Islamic Mission (WIM) in 1973 at Makkah and became the leader of WIM in England. He worked in the United Kingdom to strengthen the movement of Ahle Sunna wal Jam'aat. Qadri through this movement shaped spirituality based Islam in Europe. Sufi Abdullah  a Sunni Sufi scholar, also established a strong Ahle Sunnat foundation in the Bradford.

Allama Qamaruzzaman Azmi who is present General Secretary of World Islamic Mission worked for five decades in several parts of Europe and U.K to establish several mosques and institutions with his support and supervision.   
In Bradford, Azmi help established Islamic Missionary College (IMC) Bradford. In Manchester he established, North Manchester Jamia Mosque and in Birmingham, Ghamkol Shariff Masjid. His continuous Dawah work helped Southerland Mosque become of Sunni Barelvi.

International Sunni organization Dawat-e-Islami has at least 38 Centers in the United Kingdom.

Muhammad Imdad Hussain Pirzada, a leading scholar of Islam and commentator of Quran, has established Darul Uloom Jamia Al-Karam in 1985, an Islamic institute which has produced over 400 British Islamic scholars. He is also president of Muslim Charity and British Muslim Forum.

South Africa
 

The Ahle Sunnat movement has presence in various cities and town of South Africa where they have build network of Madarsas and Mosques. In South Africa debate with Tablighi Jama'at was called as Sunni-Tablighi controversy. The movement is represented by Sunni Jamiatul Ulema (SJU) which was founded in 1979.
It was established to address the various social, welfare, educational and spiritual needs of the community and to preserve and to promote the teachings of the Ahle Sunnah wal Jamaah. The Imam Ahmed Raza Academy is one of the publishing house which publishes books authored by various Ahle Sunnat authors. The academy was established in 1986 (1406 A.H.)  by Sheikh Abdul Hadi Al-Qaadiri Barakaati, a graduate of Darul Uloom Manzar-e-Islam, Bareilly Shareef, India.

Darul Uloom Aleemiyah Razvia was established in 1983 and on 12 January '1990, Mufti Muhammad Akbar Hazarvi established Darul Uloom Pretoria  Darul Uloom Qadaria Ghareeb Nawaz (New Castle) is one of the leading Madarsa of the mission which was founded in 1997 at Lady smith by Maulana Syed Muhammad Aleemuddin. Jamia Imam Ahmed Raza Ahsanul Barkaat was established in 2007. All these institutions have focused more on defending Sufi beliefs from Deobandis. Debates and Munazaras are common features of these institutions
In Durban, Sunnis Barelvis run Durban's largest mosque, the Juma Mosque which is also known as Grey Street mosque. The Sunni Barelvi community celebrates Mawlid un Nabi and observes anniversaries of Sufis in association with various Sufi orders.

In Mauritius, the Ahl-e Sunnat or Sunni (Barelvi)  forms majority population. Muhammad Abdul Aleem Siddiqi established the movement in Mauritius. World Islamic Mission (WIM),  Halqa-e-Qadria Ishaat-e-Islam and Sunni Razvi Society founded by Muhammad Ibrahim Siddiqui in 1967 and Jummah Mosque (Mauritius) (1852) at Port Louis are some of the notable centers of the movement.

Europe, United States and Canada
In United States and Canada, the movement has found a strong following among Muslims of South Asian and in some cities it has significant presence. Two notable madrasas are Al-Noor Masjid in Houstn, Texas and Dar al-Ulum Azizia, in Dallas. The Sunni missionary organization Dawat-e-Islami (D.I) established twelve centers in Greece and seven in Spain which are being used as mosque and madrasas. In Athens, D.I has established four centers.

Relations with other movements
The relations of Ahle Sunnat Barelvi movement with Sunni Sufi scholars of various countries have been cordial. The only exceptions with whom Ahle Sunnat Barelvi movement has no relations are Wahabis/Deobandis. Wahabis/Deobandis were declared out of Ahle Sunnah Wal Jama'ah by 2016 international conference on Sunni Islam in Grozny.

2016 international conference on Sunni Islam in Grozny
The scholars following  Ahle Sunnat wal Jamaat from India and Pakistan namely Sheikh Abubakr Ahmad, Grand Mufti of India, Shaikh Anwar Ahmad al- Baghdadi and Mufti Muḥammad Muneeb-ur-Rehman, Grand Mufti of Pakistan, participated in International Conference on Sunni Islam in Chechen Republic at Grozny in 2016. The conference was convened to define the term "Ahl al-Sunnah wa al-Jama'ah", i.e. who are "the people of Sunnah and majority Muslim community", and to oppose Salafi/Wahabi  groups and their ideology. It was attended by 200 notable Muslim scholars from 30 countries which includes Ahmed el-Tayeb (Grand Imam of Al-Azhar), Shawki Allam (Grand Mufti of Egypt), Ali Gomaa (former Grand Mufti of Egypt), Habib Ali al-Jifri among others. It identified Salafism/Wahhabism as a dangerous and misguided sect, along with the extremist groups, such as ISIS, Hizb ut-Tahrir, the Muslim Brotherhood and others.
The conference definition stated:
"Ahl al-Sunnah wa al-Jama'ah are the Ash'arites and Maturidis (adherents of the theological systems of Imam Abu Mansur al-Maturidi and Imam Abu al-Hasan al-Ash'ari). In matters of belief, they are followers of any of the four schools of thought (Hanafi, Maliki, Shafi'i or Hanbali) and are also the followers of the Sufism of Imam Junaid al-Baghdadi in doctrines, manners and [spiritual] purification." This definition was in accordance with the ideology of Ahle Sunnat Barelvi movement. The relations with Deobandi and Wahabism have been strained; Scholars of Ahle Sunnat declared Deoband's founders and Ahl-e-Hadith scholars as "Gustakh-e-Rasool" (the one who blasphemes against the Prophet) and infidels and apostates due to their certain writings found to be against Prophet of Islam.

Opposition to terrorism 

They opposes South Asian Deobandi Taliban movements, organizing rallies and protests in India and Pakistan and condemning what they view as unjustified sectarian violence. The Sunni Ittehad Council (SIC), an alliance of eight Sunni organizations, launched the Save Pakistan Movement to slow Talibanisation. Calling the Taliban a product of global anti-Islamic conspiracies, SIC leaders accused the Taliban of playing into the hands of the United States to divide Muslims and degrade Islam. Supporting this movement, Pakistani Minister of Foreign Affairs Shah Mehmood Qureshi said: "The Sunni Tehreek has decided to activate itself against Talibanisation in the country. A national consensus against terrorism is emerging across the country."
In 2009, Islamic scholar Sarfraz Ahmed Naeemi issued a fatwa denouncing suicide bombings and criticized Taliban leader Sufi Muhammad by saying that he "should wear bangles if he is hiding like a woman". Naeemi added, "Those who commit suicide attacks for attaining paradise will go to hell, as they kill many innocent people", and was later killed by a suicide bomber.
In India, the Sunni Barelvi community has issued of a fatwa against terrorism, with concerns expressed over activities of Wahabis in New Delhi at All India Sunni Conference in Feb 2016.

Notable scholars

Abdul Hamid Qadri Badayuni (1898–1970)
Ahmad Saeed Kazmi (1913–1986)
Ahmed Raza Khan Barelvi (1856–1921) – a reformer who was founder of the Barelvi movement
Akhtar Raza Khan (1941–2018) – former grand mufti and chief islamic justice of India 
Ameen Mian Qaudri (born 1955)
Amjad Ali Aazmi (1882–1948)
Arshadul Qaudri (1925–2002)
Asjad Raza Khan (born 1970) – said to be Qadi Al-Qudaat (chief Islamic justice) of India.
Ghulam Ali Okarvi (1919–2000)
Hamid Raza Khan (1875–1943)
Hamid Saeed Kazmi (born 1957)
Ilyas Qadri (born 1950) – main leader of Dawat-e-Islami.
Jamaat Ali Shah (1834–1951) – President of All India Sunni Conference
Kanthapuram A.P. Aboobacker Musliyar (born 1931) – said to be Grand Mufti of India
Kaukab Noorani Okarvi (born 1957)
Khadim Hussain Rizvi (1966–2020)
Maulana Sardar Ahmad (1903–1962)
Mohammad Abdul Ghafoor Hazarvi (1909–1970) — Jamiat Ulema-e-Pakistan
Muhammad Arshad Misbahi (born 1968)
Muhammad Fazal Karim (1954–2013)
Muhammad Fazlur Rahman Ansari (1914–1974)
Muhammad Karam Shah al-Azhari (1918–98) – author of Tafsir Zia ul Quran (1995) and Zia un Nabi
Muhammad Muneeb ur Rehman (born 1945)
Muhammad Muslehuddin Siddiqui (1918–1983)
Muhammad Raza Saqib Mustafai (born 1972)
Muhammad Shafee Okarvi (1930–1984) — founder of Jamaat Ahle Sunnat
Muhammad Waqaruddin Qadri (1915–1993) – former Mufti-e-Azam Pakistan
Mustafa Raza Khan Qadri (1892–1981)
Naeem-ud-Deen Muradabadi (1887–1948)
Naseeruddin Naseer Gilani (1949–2009)
Qamaruzzaman Azmi (born 1946)
Shahabuddin Razvi (born 1974) - The Preacher of Dargah Ala Hazrat
Sarfraz Ahmed Naeemi (1948–2009)
Shah Ahmad Noorani (1926–2003) — founder of World Islamic Mission in 1972
Shakir Ali Noori (born 1960)
Shamsul-hasan Shams Barelvi (1917–1997)
Shihabuddeen Ahmed Koya Shaliyathi (1885–1954)
Syed Faiz-ul Hassan Shah (1911–1984) – President of Jamiat-e-Ulema, Pakistan
Syed Mohammed Madni Ashraf (born 1938)
Syed Mohammed Mukhtar Ashraf (died 1996)
Syed Shujaat Ali Qadri (1941–1993) – judge Federal Shariat Court, Pakistan 
Yaseen Akhtar Misbahi – director, Darul Qalam, New Delhi
Ziaul Mustafa Razvi Qadri (born 1935) – Muhaddis al-Kabeer, present Deputy Chief Islamic Justice of India (Deputy Grand Mufti of India)
Muhammad Tahir-ul-Qadri (born 1951) – Minhaj-ul-Quran International, founder
Mufti Muhammad Akmal Madani (born 1968) – Al Furqan Scholars Academy, director

Notable organizations
In Pakistan, prominent Sunni Barelvi religious and political organizations include:

Dawat-e-Islami
Jamaat Ahle Sunnat
Jamiat Ulema-e-Pakistan
Majlis-e-Tahaffuz-e-Khatme Nabuwwat – The Assembly to Protect the End of Prophethood
Sunni Ittehad Council
Sunni Tehreek
Tehreek-e-Labaik
 Minhaj-ul-Quran
 Markaj-e-Majlis-e-Raza, Lahore 
 Raza Academy 
 Raza Foundation
 Kanzul Iman Society

In India 

All India Ulema and Mashaikh Board
Jama'at Raza-e-Mustafa
Karwan-I-Islami
Muslim Jamaat
Raza Academy

In United Kingdom 
World Islamic Mission
British Muslim Forum
Kanzul Huda

In Bangladesh 
World Sunni Movement
Bangladesh Islami Front
Bangladesh Islami Chattra Sena
 Anjuman-E-Rahmania Ahmadia Sunnia Trust
 A'la Hazrat Foundation 
 Raza Islamic Academy

In South Africa 
 A'la Hazrat Academy 
 Sunni Rizvi Society
 Imam Mustafa Raza Research Centre, Durban, South Africa

In Iraq 
 Ala Mazmaur Rizvi Al Alimi, Baghdad

Main institutions

India

Al Jamiatul Ashrafia, Uttar Pradesh, India
Al-Jame-atul-Islamia, Raunahi 
Jamia Al Barkaat Aligarh, Aligarh
Jamia Amjadia Rizvia, Ghosi 
Jamiatur Raza, Bareilly
Manzar-e-Islam, Bareilly
Markazu Saqafathi Sunniyya
Jamia Nizamia, Hyderabad

Pakistan

Aleemiyah Institute of Islamic Studies
Jamia Amjadia Rizvia Karachi
Ashraf ul Madaris, G.T Road, Okara, Punjab, Pakistan
Jamia Naeemia Lahore
Jamia Nizamia Ghousia Wazirabad
Jamia-tul-Madina

Bangladesh
 Jamia Ahmadiyya Sunnia Kamil Madrasa
 Quaderia Taiyebia Alia Kamil Madrasah
 Chipatali Jamia Gausia Muinia Kamil ( M.A) Madrasah

United Kingdom
Jamia Al-Karam

Republic of Ireland
Al-Mustafa Islamic Cultural Centre Ireland

See also

 Pakistan Movement
 Islamic Republic of Pakistan
 Islam in India
 Islam in Pakistan
 Islamic schools and branches
 Schools of Islamic theology
 List of Muslim philosophers
 List of Pakistani poets
 List of Urdu-language poets

Notes

References

External links
Ahle Sunnat
Ahlus Sunnah Islamic Resource
Islamic Academy
Ahlesunnat Network Pakistan
Kanzuliman Foundation
Sunni.org.uk

 
Sunni Islamic movements
Bareilly
1904 establishments in India
Ahmed Raza Khan Barelvi
Sunni Islamic branches
Hanafis
Maturidis